Supernatural Law, previously known as Wolff and Byrd, Counselors of the Macabre, is a comic strip, comic book and web comic series written and illustrated by Batton Lash.  The series features the law practice of Alanna Wolff and Jeff Byrd, who specialize in serving the legal needs of monsters and other supernatural beings, or those who find themselves in conflict with such beings.  Wolff and Byrd themselves are human, as is their secretary Mavis.  The series tagline is "Beware the creatures of the night—they have lawyers!"

The series first appeared, as "Wolff and Byrd, Counselors of the Macabre", in The Brooklyn Paper in 1979.  From 1983 to 1997 The National Law Journal ran the weekly strip. The characters made occasional appearances in comic books over the years (Mr. Monster, Munden's Bar Special, Satan's Six).

In May 1994 an ongoing comic book series was launched, Wolff and Byrd, Counselors of the Macabre, under the imprint Exhibit A Press. The title was changed to Supernatural Law with issue #24, in part to avoid readers' confusion over how to pronounce "macabre," and to bring it in line with the planned title of a motion picture adaptation.  An occasional spin-off comic has also come out focusing on their secretary, Mavis.  The strips and comics have been collected into a number of trade paperbacks with introductions by writers including Neil Gaiman and Will Eisner.

In 2005, a weekly Supernatural Law web comic began publishing on Webcomics Nation, in what Lash has described as an attempt to grow an audience outside of comics shops. After Webcomics Nation ceased operation, Supernatural Law moved to its own website.

Batton Lash writes and draws all the stories, with art assists by Trevor Nielson and Melissa Uran. The series is edited by Jackie Estrada. Mitch Berger, Esq. serves as legal consultant.

A 2009 collection of Wolff and Byrd stories, The Soddyssey, and Other Tales of Supernatural Law, won the Independent Book Publishers Association's Benjamin Franklin Award. The story contains guest art by Steve Bissette, Bernie Wrightson, Jeff Smith, Shawn McManus, Phil Hester, and Charles Vess.

Collected editions

References

External links
 Exhibit A Press
 

1979 comics debuts
American comic strips
Fantasy comics
Fiction about law
Horror comics
Satirical comics